Joseph Félix Henri Auvray (1800–1833) was a French historical painter.

Life and career 
Auvray was born at Cambrai in 1800. He was a pupil of Momal in Valenciennes, and afterwards of Antoine-Jean Gros in Paris. In 1824 he exhibited St. Louis a Prisoner, and in 1827, Gautier de Châtillon defending St. Louis against the Saracens, now in the Museum of Cambrai, and St. Paul at Athens. He died at Cambrai in 1833.

References
 

19th-century French painters
French male painters
1800 births
1833 deaths
People from Cambrai
Pupils of Antoine-Jean Gros
19th-century French male artists
18th-century French male artists